George Edward Harney (1840–1924) was a late 19th-century American architect based in New York City.

Biography
George Edward Harney was born in Lynn, Massachusetts in 1840. He received his early training in the office of local engineer Alonzo Lewis.  In 1863, he relocated to Cold Spring, New York, with an office in Newburgh, just upriver.  He moved to New York City in 1873 and partnered with William I. Paulding, their firm Harney & Paulding, only lasting for that year.  Soon after Harney took his draftsman William S. Purdy as a partner in the firm Harney & Purdy.  They remained associated until at least 1910. 

Harney died in New York City on November 12, 1924.

Selected architectural works 

 Cold Spring Cemetery Gatehouse, Nelsonville, NY (1863)
Robert Parker Parrott House, "Plumbush," Cold Spring, NY (1865)
Remodeling of 8 Chestnut Street, Cold Spring, NY (1866–67)
Transept and extension, Dutch Reformed Church, Newburgh, NY (1867–68)
 Episcopal Church of St. Mary-in-the-Highlands, Cold Spring, NY (1867–68)
George W. Leonard Stable, Grand Street, Newburgh, NY (1868)
St. Paul's Episcopal Church, Wallingford, CT (1868–69)
United Methodist Church of Wappingers Falls, Wappingers Falls, NY (1868–70)
Unitarian Church of Our Father, Newburgh, NY (1869–70)
Laura A. Fellows House, "Overdell," Balmville, NY (1869–70, demolished)
St. Mary's Episcopal Church and Rectory, East Providence, RI (1870)
Remodeling and outbuildings, Harriet Musgrave House, New Windsor, NY (1871)
John B. J. Fenton House, Balmville, NY (1871, demolished)
Christ Episcopal Church, Brentwood, Long Island, NY (1871)
 Chapel, St. Peter's Episcopal Church, Salem, MA (1871–72)
St. Mary's Parish House, Cold Spring, NY (1872–74) 

 Brooks Brothers Store, 670 Broadway, New York, NY (1873–74) 
 Frederic W. Stevens House, 2 W. 57th St., New York, NY (1875–76, demolished)
 Reformed Episcopal Church of the Corner Stone, Newburgh, NY (1875–76)
Children's Chime Tower, Stockbridge, MA (1878)
 Stevens Building, 18 Wall St., New York, NY (1879, demolished) 
 Barthold Schlesinger House, "Southwood," 278 Warren St., Brookline, MA (1880–82)
 Frederick Senff House, "Mountain View," New Windsor, NY (1881)
Luther Kountze House, "Delbarton," Morristown, NJ (1883)
 Commercial Union Assurance Co. Building, 46 Pine St., New York, NY (1883, demolished) 
 Eagle Insurance Company Building, 71 Wall St., New York, NY (1884, demolished)
 John H. Ballantine House, 49 Washington St., Newark, NJ (1885)
 South Highland United Methodist Church, Garrison, NY (1887)
 George Bruce Memorial Library, 226 W. 42nd St., New York, NY (1887, demolished)
 Moffat Library, 6. W. Main St., Washingtonville, NY (1887)
 George E. Dodge House, 27 W. 57th St., New York, NY (1888, demolished)
 Hotel Champlain, 136 Clinton Point Dr., Plattsburgh, NY (1888–90, burned 1910)
 Washington A. Roebling House, 191 W. State St., Trenton, NJ (1889-1892, demolished 1946)
 M. R. Townsend Houses, 3-5 E. 10th St., New York, NY (1890)
 The Arches, 341 Gin Ln., Southampton, NY (1890, demolished)
 Mercantile Library Building, 13 Astor Pl., New York, NY (1890–91)
 Delaware and Hudson Railroad Depot, 37 Lackawanna Ave., Scranton, PA (1893–99, demolished)
 Henry M. Day House, "Meadow Beach," 48 Gin Ln., Southampton, NY (1893, altered)
 Helena Flint House, 85 Larchmont Ave., Larchmont, NY (1894)
 God's Providence House, 330 Broome St., New York, NY (1894)
 Lincoln Safety Deposit Co. Warehouses, 60 E. 42nd St., New York, NY (1894, demolished)
 George E. Dodge House, 154 E. Lake Rd., Tuxedo Park, NY (1898, demolished)
 Lincoln Hospital and Home, 350 Concord Ave., Bronx, NY (1898, demolished)
 Robert Olyphant House, 16 E. 52nd St., New York, NY (1900, demolished)
D&H Railroad Depot, Saratoga Springs, NY (1900, demolished)
Toucey Memorial Parish House, St. Philip's Church, Garrison, NY (1900)
Commercial Union Assurance Co. Annex, 60 William St., New York, NY (1903, demolished)
 Fort William Henry Hotel (Addition), 48 Canada St., Lake George, NY (1908, burned 1909)

Gallery

References

External links

 

1840 births
1924 deaths
19th-century American architects
20th-century American architects
Architects from Lynn, Massachusetts
Architects from New York (state)
Architects from New York City